Krishna Bhakta Bodana is a Bollywood film. It was released in 1944.

References

External links
 

1944 films
1940s Hindi-language films
Films scored by Avinash Vyas
Indian black-and-white films